The  was a short-lived Japanese domain of the Edo period, located in Mino Province (modern-day Gifu Prefecture). It existed briefly in the 17th century, and was ruled by the Inaba clan.

List of Lords

Inaba clan (Fudai; 12,000 koku)

Masatsugu
Masayoshi
Masayasu

Domains of Japan
History of Gifu Prefecture